Spatial interaction model may refer to:

 Gravity model
 Spatial analysis